Kenneth Edward Bentsen Jr. (born June 3, 1959) is an American lobbyist and former politician from Texas, serving four terms in the United States House of Representatives from 1995 to 2003. He is the nephew of former senator and secretary of the treasury, Lloyd Bentsen.

Early life and education 
Born in Houston, Texas to Kenneth Sr. and Mary Bentsen, he graduated from Deerfield Academy in 1977. Bentsen earned a Bachelor of Arts degree from the University of St. Thomas in 1982 and an Master of Public Administration from American University in 1985.

Career 
From 1983 to 1987, he served on the staff of Congressman Ronald D. Coleman and from 1985 to 1987 was an associate staff member on the United States House Committee on Appropriations. Afterwards, he worked as an investment banker.

Congress 
Bentsen was elected to the U.S. House of Representatives in 1994 and served from 1995 to 2003. As a congressman, he was one of 81 House Democrats who voted in favor of authorizing the invasion of Iraq on October 10, 2002. In 2002, Bentsen opted to run for the U.S. Senate to replace Phil Gramm; he then lost the Democratic primary to Dallas Mayor Ron Kirk who lost the general election to Texas Attorney General John Cornyn. In May, 2006, he became president of the Equipment Leasing Association in Washington, D.C.

Later career 
Bentsen is the president and CEO of the Securities Industry and Financial Markets Association. He was named a "Top Lobbyist" by The Hill and one of "Washington's Most Influential People" by Washingtonian.

Personal life 
He has two daughters with wife Tamra Bentsen. The four reside in Washington, D.C.

External links

References 

1959 births
Living people
Deerfield Academy alumni
University of St. Thomas (Texas) alumni
American University School of Public Affairs alumni
Politicians from Houston
Democratic Party members of the United States House of Representatives from Texas
21st-century American politicians
Members of Congress who became lobbyists